Khust Raion is a raion in Zakarpattia Oblast in western Ukraine. Its administrative center is Khust, which does not belong to the district and is incorporated separately as a city of oblast significance. Population: 

On 18 July 2020, as part of the administrative reform of Ukraine, the number of raions of Zakarpattia Oblast was reduced to six, and the area of Khust Raion was significantly expanded. The January 2020 estimate of the raion population was

History

In the area there are unique wooden churches in the villages of Danylovo, Kraynikovo, Sokirnytsia , Oleksandrivka, in addition there are several monasteries: a female Orthodox in the villages of Dragovo-Zabrod, a female Orthodox in the village of Lipcha, a male Orthodox in the village of Iza, a male Khust-Gorodilovo, a male Orthodox in Khust-Kolesarovo.

There are two medieval castles in the area, which were constructed, when the territory belonged to the Kingdom of Hungary: Khust Castle and the Vyshkovsky castle ( and Visk, respectively). The ruins of the Khust Castle - in 1191 the Hungarian kings finished building a fortress, the construction of which took more than a hundred years. In 1570 the castle was transferred to the Transylvanian principality. In 1709, an all the Transylvanian Diet of Francis II Rákóczi's supporters was held in the castle. In 1766, during a major thunderstorm over Khust, lightning struck the castle's powder tower and lit it, causing much of the fortress to be destroyed.

Remains of Vyshkiv Castle - the first mention of the fort dates to the end of the 13th century. (1281), when brothers Mikó and Csépán of the Hont-Pázmány kindred on the lands donated to them by the Hungarian king Ladislaus IV built an earthen fort on Mount Var-Ged (height 589 m). It acted as the protection of the Tisza waterway, along which rock salt was coming from salt-pans. From 1300 to 1350 the fortress was the center of the Máramaros County.

In 1874 Khust inventor A. Yenkovsky from Steblyvky village invented a machine for mechanized wheat harvesting, which was later patented in the USA as a combine harvester.

After the collapse of Austria-Hungary in the fall of 1918 many Transcarpathians expressed their desire to join Ukraine, and this was clearly stated at the congress in the small town of Khust, January 21, 1919.

On March 15, 1939. It was proclaimed a new state formation - Carpathian Ukraine with a center in the city of Khust, and its first president was Augustine Voloshin. This state did not last long, as it was soon occupied and annexed by Hungary. In 1941, the Hungarian state, which included Transcarpathia, entered the Second World War.

Villages
 Berezovo, Ukraine
 Danylovo
 Iza
 Lypetska Polyana
 Nizhny Bystriy
 Sokyrnytsya
 Velyatyn
 Zaberezh
 Zolotarevo

See also
 Administrative divisions of Zakarpattia Oblast
 Carpathian wooden churches

References

 
Raions of Zakarpattia Oblast
1947 establishments in Ukraine